Andres Manambit: Angkan ng Matatapang is a 1992 Philippine biographical action film edited and directed by Ike Jarlego Jr. on his directorial debut. The film stars Eddie Garcia as the title role. The film is based on the life of the late policeman Andres Manambit. It was one of the entries in the 1992 Metro Manila Film Festival, where it won the most number of awards including Best Picture.

The film is streaming online on YouTube.

Cast
 Eddie Garcia as Andres Manambit
 Pinky de Leon as Milagros Manambit
 Eddie Gutierrez as Rafael de Jesus
 Subas Herrero as Mr. Gallego
 Kier Legaspi as Danny Manambit
 Joko Diaz as Tony Manambit
 Atong Redillas as Bert Manambit
 Michelle Ann Lope as Vicky Manambit
 Ruth Tuazon as Susan Manambit
 Jaime Garchitorena as Charlie de Jesus
 Ramon Christopher as Tom de Jesus
 Gary Garcia as Ricky de Jesus
 Dick Israel as Lt. Burgos
 Mia Pratts as Sofia
 Michelle Bautista as Letty
 Berting Labra as Potpot
 Vic Varrion as Zacarrias
 Johnny Vicar as Tirona
 Roland Montes as May
 Joey Padilla as Bert's Assassin
 Ray Ventura as Mayor
 Jose Romulo as Chief
 Pocholo Montes as Major

Awards

References

External links

Full Movie on Viva Films

1992 films
1992 action films
Filipino-language films
Philippine biographical films
Philippine action films
Viva Films films
Films directed by Ike Jarlego Jr.